The Catherine Tate Show is a British television sketch comedy written by Catherine Tate and Derren Litten. Tate also stars in all but one of the show's sketches, which feature a wide range of characters. The Catherine Tate Show airs on BBC Two and is shown worldwide through the BBC. Collectively, the show has been nominated for six BAFTA Awards, two British Comedy Awards and an Emmy Award, and it has won two Royal Television Society Awards, two British Comedy Awards and a National Television Award since its debut in 2004.

Broadcast

The first series of the show, which consisted of six episodes, aired from 16 February to 22 March 2004. A DVD of this series was released in August 2005.

A second series aired from 21 July to 25 August 2005, and a 40-minute Christmas special was aired on 20 December 2005. For this series a new theme tune was introduced. A DVD of series two was released in October 2006.

The third series aired from 14 October to 25 November 2006. There had been speculation that this would be the final series; however, Tate explained in an interview on This Morning that she had never said this and would like to at least do specials in the future.

Tate filmed a Christmas special which aired on 25 December 2007. Tate has announced that there will be no more series after the special; however, a Christmas special was shown on 25 December 2009. Another 30-minute episode involving the Nan character was shown in January 2014. Two new Christmas specials aired on 27 and 30 December 2015 again involving Nan. On 4 January 2016, Tate announced that she does not plan to make anymore specials as she is busy with other projects.

On 24 November 2018, during the Sydney show of her Australian tour at the State Theatre, Tate revealed that there will be another series of the show.

Characters and sketches

This is only a list and small description of the most popular or well-known characters.

Joanie "Nan" Taylor is a foul-mouthed grandmother who constantly swears at and criticises other people, especially when they are not present, including her grandson Jamie (Mathew Horne). She often uses the phrases such as "What a load of ol' shit!". She is typically nice to visitors in a completely over the top manner, then, the instant they have departed, dropping the façade and saying: "What a fuckin' liberty!" in a disgusted manner (usually because of a completely spurious complaint). When her grandson takes her to a pound shop she asks the price of everything that takes her interest.
Paul and Sam are a Thames Estuary/Essex couple played by Tate and former EastEnders actor Lee Ross, Sam comes home from work with "amazing" tales of her mundane life at work and Paul hangs on every word getting as excited as she does over the trivial things that they blow out of all proportion. Their catchphrases included "What am I like, What are you like" and "I dunno". In the third series Sam and Paul only appeared in the last episode due to Lee Ross' work on EastEnders as Owen.
Lauren Cooper is an argumentative and lazy teenage girl who gets out of awkward situations by repeating her catchphrase, "Am I bovvered?" or "Look at my face, is my face bovvered? Face? Bovvered?" In 2006, this catchphrase was named Word of the Year and entered the Oxford English Dictionary. A spokesperson for the OED commented: 
In How Many, How Much two office workers, Kate and Ellen, who sit next to each other. While Ellen (played by Ella Kenion) is usually keen to get on with her work, she is frequently interrupted by Kate (Tate), who asks her to guess answers to questions, and when she answers wrongly gets mad; however, when Ellen then gives the right answer, Kate just says "...Yeah", insults her, and then gets back to work.
The Aga Saga Woman is an upper middle class English woman who goes into a state of shock in various, seemingly harmless situations when confronted with people, places, or products, which are lower than her own social class. She has two children, Thomas and Chloe. She is identified as "Mrs Montgomery" in series 2 and later "Mrs Taylor-Thomas" in series 3.
Derek Faye is a man who shows several signs of being gay but seems to be in denial about his sexuality and becomes extremely offended and defensive when people assume he is gay, often exclaiming, "How very dare you!" or, "Who, dear? Me, dear? Gay, dear? No, dear."
Janice and Ray are a couple from Beverley, East Riding of Yorkshire who express their disgust at the various signs of multi-culturalism in their very British circle. Sources of outrage include restaurant meals, due to their perception of over-pricing or the exotic nature of the food such as grapes in a brie cheese sandwich. They perceive global foods as adulterated British fare and view such culinary transgressions as personal affronts – finally responding with their catchphrase "The dirty bastards!"
Geordie Georgie is a frequent petitioner, always trying to get her co-worker, Martin, to sponsor "me and some of the girls" in her latest charitable endeavour. With facts such as "Every 38 minutes ..." she follows her statements up with "If you don't believe me then log on to the website w, w, w, dot...". When Martin offers some amount she invariably takes umbrage and berates him with further details of the people she is trying to help. After she accepts his second offer she does something – often assaults him – to "show him what it's like". Third series only.
Ally is a tactless woman with good intentions who unfortunately is a perfect example of someone with foot-in-mouth syndrome. Unwittingly she offends all that she comes into contact with at parties, and then in an attempt to dig herself out of the ditch she has created, only worsens the situation.
Bernie is a vulgar Irish nurse with an infectious snort, who works at a hospital who is never shy from both saying it how it is, and from airing her personal problems or feelings with everyone and anyone, particularly the male doctors.

Television series

Series 1 (2004)
The first series of the show, which consisted of six episodes, aired from 16 February to 22 March 2004. The programme's theme tune for the first series was "In These Shoes?" by Kirsty MacColl, featured on her 2000 album Tropical Brainstorm.

In the months preceding the launch of the second series, BBC Two aired three "best of" episodes, featuring a variety of the funniest clips from the six episodes of series one, including Lauren Cooper the teenager and Joanie Taylor the foul-mouthed grandmother. Meanwhile, repeats of all six episodes of the first series aired on UKTV G2 (now Dave). Tate also appeared in a comedy sketch with boy band McFly (see charity sketches for details).

In 2004, Catherine Tate won a British Comedy Award for "Best Comedy Newcomer" for her work on the first series of The Catherine Tate Show.

Series 2 (2005)
The second series aired from 21 July to 25 August 2005. Following Tate's Comic Relief appearance with McFly, and speculation of her non-existent feud with David Schwimmer, it received slightly more publicity than series one in the run-up to the first episode. BBC Two also promoted the series by running trailers showing Lauren arguing with a furry dog in the shape of the channel's logo.

This series was far more successful with viewing figures than the first, securing ratings of 2.89 to 3.92 million, with the final episode receiving higher viewing figures than the episode of Extras which aired beforehand. Celebrities such as Peter Kay and Jill Halfpenny made guest appearances in series two. The series also had new theme music composed by Howard Goodall. For the opening, various characters are in an open field. The camera closes in on Lauren Cooper, zooms into her eye, then zooms out of Sheila Carter's eye. The camera pans to the right, where Bernie enters. The camera zooms into her eye, then zooms out of Nan's eye, where she is seen laughing. The end of the sequence shows the main title The Catherine Tate Show. The zooming is the same for both series two and three although Shelia Carter does not appear in series three (in the 2007 Christmas Special, Sheila is replaced by Geordie Georgie).

The second series began airing in Australia on 4 April 2007 on ABC TV. Before this the BBC-owned Australian cable channel BBC UKTV had aired the complete series starting in 2004. The re-runs of the series were shown starting from 6 May 2007.

In November 2005, Tate was a guest at the 77th Royal Variety Performance, and appeared in the guise of teenager Lauren Cooper, accompanied by Lauren's friends, Ryan and Liese. After Lauren embarrassed herself in front of the audience, Ryan pointed out that the Queen was laughing at her. Looking up at the Royal Box, she asked, "Are you disrespecting me?" and mimicked the Queen's accent, asking, "Is one bovvered? Is one's face bovvered?", before adding, "Who is looking after the corgis?" The Queen was seen laughing at this joke, and Prince Philip also appeared to take this in good humour. There were, however, reports that the Prince was extremely unimpressed by the performance and complained to the show's executive producer. She also appeared as Lauren in a special sketch for the BBC's annual Children in Need telethon. The segment was a crossover with EastEnders (see charity sketches for details).

A Christmas show was aired on 20 December 2005. It featured appearances from celebrity guests Richard Park, Charlotte Church and Chas & Dave. During the show, Paul and Sam's two children were seen for the first time: they looked and acted exactly like their parents. The characters of Margaret and the enigmatic detective, who did not appear in series two, made appearances in the Christmas special. According to BARB's official viewing figures, over 5.66 million viewers watched the show, making it the most-watched programme at the time and the most watched programme on BBC Two the week it was aired. The show was also nominated for the People's Choice Award at the British Comedy Awards in 2005, but did not win after it was announced that the show had received fewer votes than Ant and Dec's Saturday Night Takeaway. In an investigation, it was revealed in May 2008 that The Catherine Tate Show was the true winner of the British Comedy Award, and that Ant and Dec were wrongly awarded; Tate had actually received more votes from the public. A report by independent law firm, Olswang, said "Robbie Williams was invited to present an award. It was understood that he would be happy [to do so] if the recipients were Anthony McPartlin and Declan Donnelly. In order to ensure his attendance, this assurance was given"; however, it is not known if Williams' comments led to the wrong announcement. It was also exposed that the second half of the ceremony was not broadcast live but with a delay of half-an-hour, yet viewers were still encouraged to vote for the People's Choice Award, even though the votes had been counted and the trophy presented half-an-hour before.

The second series started airing on UKTV G2 in January 2006. Series one continued on UKTV Gold. The second series was also being screened on BBC America, and repeated on BBC Two, from June 2006. Following the success of series two, Tate launched a range of merchandise based on characters from the show in 2006. In September 2006 The Catherine Tate Show official calendar 2007 was released. Also, on 2 October 2006 a book was released of the scripts of both series one and two, called Am I Bovvered The Catherine Tate Show Scripts.

On 13 December 2006, Tate won another British Comedy Award for "Best TV Comedy Actress" for her work in the second series of The Catherine Tate Show.

Series 3 (2006)
The third series started on 26 October 2006 and ran until 25 November 2006. Before the launch of the series, it had been reported that BBC One controller Peter Fincham hoped to lure Tate to the channel; however, she decided to stay with BBC Two, where she would not be as pressured to secure higher ratings.

The series gained strong viewing figures for BBC Two, ranging from 4.00 to 4.92 million, becoming the top show on BBC Two each week. There were many more guest appearances in the third series which included Paul O'Grady being featured in a sketch with Joanie "Nan" Taylor when she appeared on The Paul O'Grady Show.

Specials (2007)
On 19 February 2007, Tate appeared again on This Morning and stated that a forty-minute Comic Relief special had been made, which aired on 16 March 2007. Several sketches were interspersed throughout the Comic Relief programme, with guests such as the prime minister at the time, Tony Blair (see charity sketches for details). Kim Cattrall has also expressed an interest in appearing on an episode of the show. Cattrall commented that she is a "huge fan" and would like to be given a role.

Tate has revealed that she is considering taking the characters from the show on the road for a UK stage tour. Series Three was released on DVD on 12 November 2007. On 31 October 2007 The Catherine Tate Show won the National Television Award for most popular comedy as voted for by the public.

A new Christmas special episode aired on 25 December 2007 on BBC One, in which pop star George Michael made a guest appearance. He was featured in several scenes with Irish nurse, Bernie, including one kissing scene. The character of Lauren was killed in a kayaking accident during the episode. Rumours had emerged about this story line in July 2007. Kathy Burke and Tamzin Outhwaite also guest starred, and the special averaged with 6.4 million viewers.

The episode was subject to criticism when some viewers complained about the amount of swearing, and accused Tate of bigotry over the depiction of a family from Northern Ireland as terrorists, whose Christmas presents included a balaclava and a pair of knuckle dusters, in reference to The Troubles. A statement was issued from the BBC that read "Catherine Tate creates characters who are so over the top as to be almost cartoon-like and this is where her genius lies. Her comedy is never meant to offend any viewer and is always based on satire and grotesque exaggeration."

After the complaints were made, an Ofcom report later concluded that the show was not offensive and did not violate broadcasting regulations. An extract from the Ofcom report read "Overall this episode was typical of the Catherine Tate Show and would not have gone beyond the expectations of its usual audience. For those not familiar with the show, the information given at the start was adequate."

During Tate's appearance on The Paul O'Grady Show on 24 September 2007, Tate did not make a reference to the speculation of there being any more series, but she did state that she may just continue her work on The Catherine Tate Show through one-off specials. It has since been announced by Tate that she does not plan any more series after the Christmas special. She commented: "It's hard to keep coming up with ideas. And I'd like to stay in people's good graces, rather than, 'Oh no, she's not doing another series of that, is she?'" Tate also left to concentrate on other projects such as her role as Donna Noble, in series four of Doctor Who.

Spin-offs

Nan's Christmas Carol (2009)
The BBC confirmed that a new Christmas special will be broadcast in December 2009, titled Nan's Christmas Carol, featuring Tate's Nan character as Scrooge. The special guest stars Mathew Horne (reprising his role as Nan's grandson Jamie) and Ben Miller, David Tennant and Roger Lloyd-Pack as ghosts. Niky Wardley who played many various characters mainly Lisa Jackson, also returned as Joanie Taylor's mother. Despite this special, shown on 25 December 2009, Tate has reiterated that she has no plans for the show to make a full return.

Catherine Tate's Nan (2014–2015)

In 2013, a new New Year's special was produced and was broadcast on 4 January 2014. The story features Nan as she is accompanied by a school girl named Alice, who has volunteered to visit Nan as part of the 'Young and Old Buddy-Up Foundation' while her grandson, Jamie is in Africa helping to build a school for orphans and keeps in contact with Nan regularly via Skype. As Nan's tap is broken, she and Alice head to the council to see if they can get someone to fix and there Nan land herself in trouble for 'disturbing the peace and simulating a heart attack' at the local community centre. Returning guest stars include Mathew Horne and Niky Wardley and with Ami Metcalf as Alice.

In 2015, it was announced that two new 'Nan' specials were produced in 2015 and broadcast in December 2015. The first special was aired on 27 December 2015 and the second on 30 December 2015.

Nan: The Movie

In early 2019, an announcement was made that Catherine Tate's Nan would be developed into a feature film adaptation. In September 2019, it was confirmed that the film would receive a release sometime in 2020. Alongside Tate, it was also confirmed that Matthew Horne would be returning as Jamie, and that fellow co-star of the original series, Niky Wardley, would also appear. It will be directed by Josie Rourke.

Charity sketches
Tate appeared on the BBC's Comic Relief telethon in March 2005, in the guise of Lauren Cooper. In a section of the show, which featured fans of McFly asking questions to the group, Lauren decides to ask, "Why are you so rubbish?" When told by Simon Amstell, who is hosting the segment, that only positive questions are allowed, Lauren uses a variety of her catchphrases, including "Am I bovvered?" and "Are you calling me stupid?" Lauren is then "ordered" to ask a more positive question to the group, and confuses them with Busted, asking, "Are you gutted that Charlie left?" When told to leave the set, on her way out she asks Danny Jones from McFly to sign her knee, walking away promptly saying "You can't even spell."

In November 2005, Tate appeared as Lauren in a special sketch for the BBC's annual Children in Need telethon. The segment is posed as a crossover with EastEnders, featuring Barbara Windsor as Peggy Mitchell, Kacey Ainsworth as Little Mo and Lacey Turner as Stacey Slater. The sketch sees Lauren arrive in Walford in search of revenge on Stacey, who has apparently stolen her boyfriend. When she makes an appearance in the Queen Vic, Peggy finds herself getting increasingly frustrated with Lauren, who asks, "Are you a Cockney? Are you a Cockney sparrow?" (pronounced 'Cock-er-ney') and "Do you know Chas & Dave? Are you their mum?" repeatedly. Peggy also unintentionally uses some of Lauren's catchphrases, such as "Are you disrespecting my family?" and "Are you calling me a pikey?" Lauren eventually leaves the pub after mixing some famous lines from the soap, including "Hello princess" and "Rickaay!" with her usual catchphrase, "Bovvered?".

In the BBC's Sport Relief, Tate created a sketch as "Nan", commenting on the 1966 World Cup win and the comments of Kenneth Wolstenholme. The sketch involves "Nan" and her grandson watching a David Beckham football game, where she expresses her disgust at the objective of football by exclaiming "What a load of old shit!".

On 16 March 2007, Catherine Tate appeared on Red Nose Day 2007 as many of her well-known characters from the show. The sketches were interspersed throughout the Comic Relief programme. Guests in sketches include David Tennant (who acts as Lauren Cooper's teacher and actually turns out to be the real Doctor), and Daniel Craig as another one of Elaine Figgis' boyfriends whom she has met through the internet. This sketch also spawned a popular internet meme "Do you fancy Billie Piper, sir?" During his time as prime minister, Tony Blair made a cameo appearance in a sketch, which features Lauren Cooper on work experience at 10 Downing Street. Upon Lauren attempting to tell Blair who the most famous person she has met is, he asks her if he is "bovvered". Geordie Georgie appeared with Lenny Henry when he does his own fund raising for Comic Relief, and Joanie Taylor also appeared on game show Deal or No Deal hosted by Noel Edmonds. The DVD of the sketches was available exclusively to Amazon and became the most pre-ordered DVD the site has ever seen.

On 13 March 2009, Nan appeared on the 2009 Comic Relief. She was receiving a cheque for her Community Centre from Fern Britton and Alan Carr. She was then disgusted that she only got £1000.

Live show
On 27 April 2016, Tate announced she would be taking her characters on tour later the same year. She performed in theatres across the UK between 31 October and 4 December 2016. Tate was joined on stage by long time collaborators Niky Wardley and Mathew Horne as well as actor and comedian Brett Goldstein playing various characters. The show also featured pre-recorded cutaway cameos by Billy Connolly (as God & the Devil), Richard Sandling (as Steve) and Nick Grimshaw (as himself).

On 17 October 2018, it was announced that the show would run in London's West End at the Wyndham's Theatre for one week from 7 to 12 January 2019. On 29 October 2018, tickets for shows were added due to popular demand.

Awards and nominations

Won
2004: Banff Rockie Award — Best Comedy
2004: British Comedy Award — Best TV Comedy Newcomer
2006: British Comedy Award – Best TV Comedy Actress
2006: RTS Television Award — Best Comedy Performance
2006: RTS Television Award – Best Entertainment
2007: National Television Award — Most Popular Comedy Programme

Nominated
2004: British Comedy Award – Best TV Comedy Actress
2004: RTS Television Award – Best Make Up Design in Entertainment and Non-Drama Productions
2005: BAFTA TV Award — Best New Writer
2005: BAFTA TV Award – Comedy Programme or Series Award
2005: British Comedy Award – Best TV Comedy Actress
2005: British Comedy Award – People's Choice Award (Polled most votes but award not received)
2005: International Emmy — Best Performance by an Actress
2006: BAFTA TV Award – Best Comedy Performance
2006: BAFTA TV Award – Best Comedy Programme or Series "production team"
2006: National Television Award – Most Popular Comedy Programme
2007: BAFTA TV Award – Best Comedy Programme
2007: BAFTA TV Award – Best Make Up & Hair Design

Guest stars

Series 2
Brian Murphy – with Irene and Vern
Geraldine McNulty – with Paul and Sam
Jill Halfpenny – with The Aga Saga Woman
Michael Brandon – with Boob Job Babe
Paul Whitehouse – with Paul and Sam
Peter Kay – with Joanie "Nan" Taylor
Roger Allam – with Bernie
Siobhan Redmond – with Gingers For Justice
Una Stubbs – with Trudy and Ivan

Series 3
Bonnie Langford – with Derek Faye
Jools Holland – with Helen Marsh
Rhona Martin – with Helen Marsh
Leslie Phillips – with Joanie "Nan" Taylor
Natalie Cassidy – with Lauren Cooper
Nick Sidi – with Derek Faye
Patsy Palmer – with Gingers For Justice
Paul O'Grady – with Joanie "Nan" Taylor
Sheila Hancock – with Joanie "Nan" Taylor
Siobhan Redmond – with Gingers For Justice
Tom Ellis – with Ma Willow
Una Stubbs – with Ma Willow
Dominic West – with Frankie Howerd impressionist

Christmas specials
Colin Morgan – John Leary (with the O'Leary family)
Charlotte Church – with Joanie "Nan" Taylor
Chas & Dave – with Joanie "Nan" Taylor
David Tennant – with Joanie "Nan" Taylor
George Michael – with Bernie
Kathy Burke – with Joanie "Nan" Taylor
Philip Glenister – with Ma Willow
Richard Park – with Lauren Cooper
Tamzin Outhwaite – with Paul and Sam

Charity sketches
Daniel Craig – with Elaine Figgis
David Tennant – with Lauren Cooper
Lenny Henry – with Geordie Georgie
Kacey Ainsworth – with Lauren Cooper
McFly – with Lauren Cooper
Noel Edmonds – with Joanie "Nan" Taylor
Barbara Windsor – with Lauren Cooper
Simon Amstell – with Lauren Cooper
Lacey Turner – with Lauren Cooper
Tony Blair – with Lauren Cooper
Alan Carr and Fern Britton – with Joanie "Nan" Taylor

Books
 Am I Bovvered The Catherine Tate Show Scripts (2005)

DVD releases
All three series and the Christmas specials of The Catherine Tate Show have been released on DVD.  In the UK and Australia all three series have been separately released, with the first Christmas special (2005) being part of series two, a series one & two boxset was released, and a complete series boxset was released.  The Australian version of the complete boxset includes the second Christmas special (2007), but, the UK version doesn't, it is released as a separate edition.  The third Christmas special Nan's Christmas Carol (2009) has been released in the UK.

In the United States, Series one and two have only been released separately, and the first Christmas special is released as a separate edition.

References

External links
 

Catherinetateshow.co.uk — Fansite
Catherinetate.co.uk — Fansite

2004 British television series debuts
2015 British television series endings
2000s British television sketch shows
2010s British television sketch shows
2000s British LGBT-related comedy television series
2010s British LGBT-related comedy television series
BBC television sketch shows
British television series revived after cancellation
English-language television shows
Television series by Banijay
Television series by Tiger Aspect Productions
Television series produced at Pinewood Studios
Television shows adapted into films